Wayne Ea Marshall  (born 13 January 1961, Oldham, Lancashire) is a British pianist, organist, and conductor.

Biography
Marshall was born to parents originally from Barbados.  He began piano studies at age 3, and heard organ music regularly as a child through Sunday church services, which initiated his interest in the organ.  He was a student at Chetham's School of Music, Manchester, from 1971 to 1979.  Marshall continued his music studies at the Royal College of Music, where he held a Foundation scholarship, and was in parallel an Organ Scholar at St George's Chapel, Windsor Castle.  He did post-graduate studies at the Hochschule für Musik in Vienna from 1983-1984.

As an organist, Marshall has served as organist and associate artist of the Bridgewater Hall, Manchester.  In 2004, he gave the inaugural organ recital in the new Walt Disney Concert Hall, Los Angeles.  Also in Los Angeles, in October 2004, he premiered James MacMillan's organ concerto A Scotch Bestiary with the Los Angeles Philharmonic Orchestra under Esa-Pekka Salonen.  Marshall has appeared as an organist at the BBC Proms.

As a conductor, Marshall has held such posts as principal guest conductor of the Orchestra Sinfonica di Milano Giuseppe Verdi, beginning in 2007.  Marshall was chief conductor of the WDR Funkhausorchester from 2014 to 2020.  
Marshall conducted the first concert of the Chineke! Orchestra, Europe's first professional black and ethnic minority orchestra, at the Queen Elizabeth Hall in London in September 2015.  His work with contemporary music has included conducting the European premiere of John Harbison's opera The Great Gatsby at the Semperoper, Dresden on 6 December 2015.

Honours and awards
In 2004, Marshall received an Honorary Doctorate from Bournemouth University.  He became a Fellow of the Royal College of Music in 2010.  In October 2016, he was one of the recipients of the Barbados Golden Jubilee Award, for his services to music.

Marshall was appointed Officer of the Order of the British Empire (OBE) in the 2021 New Year Honours for services to music.

Selected discography 
 Show Boat (1988)
 The Virtuoso Organist (1990)
 Gershwin: Second Rhapsody; Piano Concerto in F; Porgy & Bess Symphonic Suite (1995)
 Gershwin: Rhapsody in blue; I got rhythm; An American in Paris (1995)
 Gershwin: Songbook & Improvisations (1997)
 I Got Rhythm: Wayne Marshall Plays Gershwin (1997)
 The Most Unforgettable Organ Classics Ever (1998)
 Symphonie (1998)
 Wayne Marshall Plays Bach, Liszt, Brahms (1998)
 Grainger: Works for Piano (1999)
 Swing It! (1999)
 Organ Improvisations (1999)
 Two of a Kind (2000)
 Gershwin: Rhapsody in Blue; An American in Paris; Piano Concerto; Porgy & Bess (2002)
 Organ Works; Organ Transcriptions (2003)
 Popular Pieces for Trumpet and Organ (2005)
 Gershwin: Rhapsody in Blue; Concerto in F; Porgy and Bess Suite (2005)
 Gershwin: Rhapsody in Blue; Piano Concerto; An American in Paris; Porgy and Bess Suite (2005)
 Wedding Favourites (2005)
 James Macmillan: A Scotch Bestiary; Piano Concerto No. 2 (2006)
 Blues (2006)
 George Gershwin: Concerto in F; Variations on 'I Got Rhythm'; Song Improvisations (2010)
 Rhapsody in Swing (2012)
 John Rutter: The Piano Collection (2020)

References

External links 

 Official website of Wayne Marshall
 Wayne Marshall page at AllMusic
 Agencia Camera agency page on Wayne Marshall
 William J. Zick, 'Wayne Marshall, Black British Organist, Has 21 CDS & Is Conductor of Verdi Orchestra in Milan'.  Africlassical Blog, 31 March 2010

English classical organists
British male organists
Organ improvisers
English classical pianists
Male classical pianists
English conductors (music)
British male conductors (music)
Black British classical musicians
Alumni of the Royal College of Music
People educated at Chetham's School of Music
Musicians from the Metropolitan Borough of Oldham
Officers of the Order of the British Empire
People from Oldham
1961 births
Living people
21st-century British conductors (music)
21st-century classical pianists
21st-century organists
21st-century British male musicians
English people of Barbadian descent
Male classical organists